Ernst Landsberg (12 October 1860 – 29 September 1927) was a German jurist.

He was a professor at Bonn University from 1887.

His wife was Anna Landsberg (1878–1938), and his son was Paul-Louis Landsberg (1901-1944).

Literary works 
 He completed "Geschichte der deutschen Rechtswissenschaft", 2 Vols., München, R. Oldenbourg, 1880-1910 (started by Roderich von Stintzing, 1825-83)
 Das Recht des bürgerlichen Gesetzbuchs, 1904

Notes

External links
 

1860 births
1927 deaths
Jurists from North Rhine-Westphalia
Academic staff of the University of Bonn
German people of Jewish descent
German people of Belgian descent